Liu Chun Fai (born 1956) is a former Hong Kong professional footballer. He is regarded as one of the best Hong Kong goalkeepers in the 1980s. He holds an AFC A license and the goalkeeper coach qualification.

Club career
In his player career, he played for Happy Valley, Caroline Hill, Sea Bee, Eastern, Harps, Seiko, May Ching, Lai Sun and Sing Tao.

Managerial career
He retired in the early 1990s and became a coach. He was the coach of Hong Kong 09, Yau Tsim Mong and Citizen. He started at Citizen as a goalkeeper coach, and in 2006 he became the head coach of the team. In 2007-08 season, he led the team to finish second in Hong Kong First Division and captured the champion of Hong Kong FA Cup, the first major trophy won by the team ever. With this outstanding result, he was awarded the Best Coach Award of the season.

On 5 February 2018, Liu was named as interim coach of the Hong Kong national football team following the resignation of Kim Pan-gon in December 2017.

Honours

Manager
 Citizen
 Hong Kong First Division: 2007–08

 South China
 Hong Kong First Division: 2012–13

Assistant manager
 South China
 Hong Kong First Division: 2008–09, 2009–10
 Hong Kong FA Cup: 2010–11

References

Living people
Hong Kong First Division League players
Hong Kong footballers
Seiko SA players
Eastern Sports Club footballers
Happy Valley AA players
Hong Kong football managers
Footballers at the 1990 Asian Games
1956 births
Association football goalkeepers
Asian Games competitors for Hong Kong